Dewey Corners is an unincorporated community in the town of Arcadia, Trempealeau County, Wisconsin, United States, United States. The community was named for George D. Dewey, a local land owner.

References

Unincorporated communities in Trempealeau County, Wisconsin
Unincorporated communities in Wisconsin